Totenberg may refer to the following places in Germany:

hills:
 Totenberg, the highest hill in the Bramwald, Lower Saxony
 Totenberg (Vorderer Vogelsberg) (357,5 m), near Treis an der Lumda (Staufenberg), county of Gießen, Hesse
 Großer Totenberg and Kleiner Totenberg, in the Hainleite, two spurs of the Dorn (411.2 m), near Bebra (Sondershausen), Kyffhäuserkreis, Thuringia

villages:
 Totenberg (Neheim), village in the municipality of Neheim in Neheim-Hüsten (borough of Arnsberg), Hochsauerlandkreis, North Rhine-Westphalia

nature reserves:
 Totenberg (nature reserve), on the Totenberg (Bramwald), county of Göttingen, Lower Saxony; see Totenberg#Nature reserves, fauna and flora
 Totenberg (protected area), on the Totenberg (Vorderer Vogelsberg), county of Gießen, Hesse

People 
 Amy Totenberg (born 1950), American judge
 Nina Totenberg (born 1944), American journalist
 Roman Totenberg (1911–2012), Polish-American violinist